Toussaint is a commune in the Seine-Maritime department in the Normandy region in northern France.

Geography

Population

Places of interest
 The church of Notre-Dame, dating from the eleventh century.
 The sixteenth-century stone cross.
 Traces of a Celtic cemetery.
 A large camping site.

See also
Communes of the Seine-Maritime department

References

Communes of Seine-Maritime